The 2021–22 Slovenian Football Cup was the 31st edition of the football knockout competition in Slovenia. The tournament began on 15 September 2021 and ended on 11 May 2022 with the final. Due to the COVID-19 pandemic in Slovenia, the Intercommunal Regional Cup competitions were not held in the 2020–21 season; as a result, only all ten teams of the 2020–21 Slovenian PrvaLiga and the best two teams of the 2020–21 Slovenian Second League entered the competition. Olimpija Ljubljana were the defending champions after winning the previous season's final.

Koper won their fourth title after beating Bravo 3–1 in the final. As winners, they earned a place in the second qualifying round of the 2022–23 UEFA Europa Conference League.

Qualified teams

2020–21 Slovenian PrvaLiga members
Aluminij
Bravo
Celje
Domžale
Gorica
Koper
Maribor
Mura
Olimpija
Tabor Sežana

2020–21 Slovenian Second League members
Krka
Radomlje

First round
Four first round matches were played on 15 and 16 September 2021.

|}

Quarter-finals
The quarter-finals were played on 27 and 28 October 2021.

|}

Semi-finals
The semi-finals were played on 20 and 21 April 2022.

|}

Final
The final was played on 11 May 2022.

See also
 2021–22 Slovenian PrvaLiga

References

External links
 UEFA

Slovenian Football Cup seasons
Cup
Slovenia